Cotoneaster suavis is a species of flowering plant in the family Rosaceae, native to the northern Caucasus, Central Asia (except Uzbekistan), and Afghanistan. A rabbit-tolerant shrub reaching , and hardy in USDA zones 6 through 9, it is rare in commerce.

References

suavis
Flora of the North Caucasus
Flora of Central Asia
Flora of Afghanistan
Plants described in 1954